Fred Wyers (1932-2006), was a male athlete who competed for England and Canada.

Athletics career
He represented England in the triple jump at the 1958 British Empire and Commonwealth Games in Cardiff, Wales.

Personal life
He emigrated to Canada in 1960, via Lethbridge Alberta and became the 1963 Canadian Triple Jump Champion.

References

1932 births
2006 deaths
English male triple jumpers
Athletes (track and field) at the 1958 British Empire and Commonwealth Games
Commonwealth Games competitors for England